Heavier Things is the second studio album by American singer-songwriter John Mayer, released on September 9, 2003 by Aware and Columbia Records. It debuted at #1 on the US Billboard 200, selling over 317,000 copies in its first week. Despite some criticism towards Mayer's songwriting, Heavier Things received generally positive reviews.

Background

Mayer felt he could be more relaxed focused on his art while making Heavier Things. With Jack Joseph Puig as producer, loops and horns were more prominently featured. Mayer took greater control of the creative side with this album; much of it was recorded in his New York City apartment. He also got final approval on all radio edits. Mayer explained that he did not want a "big and bold" title for the record and expressed that the name Heavier Things is "what it is" due to its "insignificance". He further said that he likes the word "things" due to finding it "nondescript and dumb, [...] kind of blunt".

Columbia Records used a conservative marketing campaign to promote the album. Columbia Records Group president Will Botwin says, "We think we're being smart. It's a long-term project. We understand what we're creating is a career. Effectively, that's the message: Keep the hype at bay." In keeping with that gameplan, the album's first single, "Bigger Than My Body", only went to radio a few weeks before the album's release; promotional broadcasts of the album were limited to MTV.com and Mayer's official site, both of whom began streaming the complete album the September 2 before its release. Scheduled television appearances included Saturday Night Live on October 4 and several late shows. Columbia Records thought it was important to put Mayer in talk show-type scenarios before the album release to help bring focus to his art and to his singer/songwriter career, and to steer away from the fame and celebrity hype.

Singles

Despite being "delayed" on the radio, the lead single "Bigger Than My Body" gained commercial and critical success. "Clarity" was the second single released from Heavier Things. Although the song receives rare airplay, it is one of Mayer's fan favorites, and is normally performed at Mayer's concerts. The song received very positive reviews from critics, mostly being praised for its relaxing style and beat.

"Daughters" was the last single released from Heavier Things. The song has become a huge commercial success, and has received largely positive reviews: several critics called the song as Mayer's best yet.

Critical reception
 
Upon its release, the album received generally positive reviews from music critics; it holds an aggregate score of 67/100 at Metacritic. Billboard magazine stated that it "firmly establishes him as a legitimate--albeit still puppy-eyed--singer/songwriter." Chicago Tribune writer Allison Stewart gave the album a favorable review and wrote that Mayer "[has] crafted a sturdy, soulful pop album that credibly expands upon — but never abandons — his core sound". Despite writing that "his self-conscious lyrics can get in the way", Russell Baillie of The New Zealand Herald praised Mayer's musicianship and gave the album 4 out of 5 stars. Rolling Stone magazine's James Hunter called Heavier Things an "equally available yet more sophisticated album" than Room for Squares. In his own review for Esquire, Mayer gave the album a "B minus", adding, "Am I the only one who finds this record creepy to make out to?" Spin said, "Sadly, Mayer's idea of a good time involves hiring jazz musicians to make himself sound like '80s James Taylor."

Accolades
Mayer earned his first number-one single with "Daughters" as well as a 2005 Grammy for Song of the Year, beating out fellow contenders Hoobastank, Alicia Keys, Tim McGraw, and Kanye West. He dedicated the award to his grandmother, Annie Hoffman, who died in May 2004. He also won Best Male Pop Vocal Performance, beating Elvis Costello, Josh Groban, Prince, and Seal for the award. At the 37th Annual Songwriters Hall of Fame Induction Ceremony in 2006, Mayer was honored with the Hal David Starlight Award.

Track listing

Personnel
Main musicians
John Mayer – vocals on all tracks, guitars on all tracks
David LaBruyere – bass guitar on all tracks except 8
Jamie Muhoberac – keyboards on all tracks except 9
Lenny Castro – percussion on all tracks except 6, 9 and 10

Additional musicians
Matt Chamberlain – drums on tracks 1, 2, 3, 6 and 10
Steve Jordan – drums on tracks 3, 4 and 5
Greg Leisz – lap steel guitar on tracks 2 and 5
Questlove – drums on track 1
Roy Hargrove – trumpet on track 1
Michael Chaves – guitar on track 3
Dan Higgins – saxophone on track 5
Jerry Hey – trumpet on track 5
Leroy – programming on track 7
J. J. Johnson – drums on track 9

Additional personnel
John Mayer – art direction
Jack Joseph Puig – production, mixing, recording
Chad Franscoviak – engineering
Ross Petersen – additional engineering
Chris Steffen – additional engineering
Lars Fox – digital engineering
Bob Ludwig – mastering
Ames Design – graphic design
Danny Clinch – photography
Chapman Baehler – album cover photography

Charts

Weekly charts

Year-end charts

Certifications

See also
 List of number-one albums of 2003 (U.S.)

References

External links
 Heavier Things at Discogs
 

2003 albums
John Mayer albums
Columbia Records albums